Misungwi District is one of the seven districts of the Mwanza Region of Tanzania. It is bordered to the north by Nyamagana District and Magu District, to the east by Kwimba District, to the south by Shinyanga Rural District and to the west by Nyang'hwale District and Lake Victoria. Misungwi is often spelled with an extra 's' to make it Missungwi. The administrative centre is in the town of Misungwi.

As of 2012, the population of the Misungwi District was 351,607, of which 30,728 are living in an urban area (Misungwi town).

Transport
Paved trunk road T8 from Shinyanga to Mwanza passes through Misungwi district from south to north.

The Central Line railway from Tabora to Mwanza passes through the district from east to west and there is one train station within the district's boundaries at the village of Fella.

Administrative subdivisions
As of 2012, Misungwi District was divided into four divisions and 27 wards.
 Inonelwa
 Mbarika
 Misungwi
 Usagara

Wards 
In 2016 Misungwi district was reorganized  into twenty seven (27) wards which are;

 Buhingo
 Bulemeji
 Busongo
 Fella 
 Gulumungu
 Idetemya
 Igokelo
 Ilujamate
 Isenengeja
 Isesa
 Kanyelele
 Kasololo
 Kijima (Misungwi)
 Koromije
 Lubili
 Mabuki
 Mamaye
 Misasi
 Mbarika
 Misungwi
 Mondo
 Mwaniko
 Nhundulu
 Shilalo
 Sumbugu
 Ukiriguru
 Usagara (Misungwi)

References

Districts of Mwanza Region